Lawrence Roderick Bruce Anderson (28 May 1895 – 8 July 1957) was an Australian rules footballer who played with Geelong in the Victorian Football League (VFL).

Family
The son of William Anderson, and Christina Anderson, née McKenzie, Lawrence Roderick Bruce Anderson was born at Mount Moriac, Victoria on 28 May 1895.

Notes

External links 

1895 births
1957 deaths
Australian rules footballers from Victoria (Australia)
Geelong Football Club players